Dieter Ulrich (12 October 1958 in Zurich) is a Swiss jazz and free improvisation musician (percussion, flugelhorn) and art historian.

Life and works 
Ulrich had piano lessons from Irma Schaichet from 1965 to 1980. He learned also playing percussion by self study from 1972. He played at first in several bands with Harald Haerter.

In 1988, he played with his own quintet in the Jazz Festival Zurich. He participated also in Daniel Mouthon's projects. He was a member of the trio AfroGarage with Christoph Baumann and Jacques Siron and appeared in many international festivals.

References 

Swiss jazz drummers
Swiss jazz composers
Swiss art historians
1958 births
Living people
Intakt Records artists